Nicholas Watt is a journalist. In 2016 he became political editor of the BBC's Newsnight.

Early life
Watt attended King's College School in Wimbledon before studying History at the University of York between 1986 and 1989, going on to study for a postgraduate diploma in Journalism Studies at the University of Wales between 1989 and 1990.

Career
Watt began his career as a political reporter based in Belfast working for The Times as Ireland Correspondent, covering the initial stages of the peace process.

In 1997, he was based in London following his appointment as political correspondent for The Times, before joining The Guardian a year later where he worked as European editor and chief political correspondent. Between 2007 and 2008, he was the acting political editor of The Observer.

In 2012, he appeared on Press Gazettes list of the 'top 50 political reporters', at number 14.

In 2016, Watt left The Guardian to become political editor of Newsnight on BBC Two, replacing Allegra Stratton. The editor of Newsnight at the time was also a former Guardian employee, Ian Katz, who said that Watt was "one of the most trusted, authoritative and engaging journalists in the country. With a background in Northern Ireland, Europe and Westminster he's also uniquely equipped to guide viewers through an increasingly fractured and complex political landscape." A number of BBC journalists were reported to be "annoyed" with the director of BBC News, James Harding, appointing figures with backgrounds in the newspaper industry, including Watt, to BBC posts.

In March 2019, he recounted a comment with strong language made by an anonymous cabinet minister under Theresa May.

In June 2021, Watt was harassed during a COVID-19 anti-lockdown demonstration outside Downing Street. Footage of his treatment was widely shared on social media and condemned by Boris Johnson and Home Secretary Priti Patel.

References 

Living people
Alumni of the University of York
BBC newsreaders and journalists
British reporters and correspondents
People educated at King's College School, London
Year of birth missing (living people)